Beatrice Wishart (born 1955 or 1956) is a Scottish Liberal Democrats politician who has been the Member of the Scottish Parliament (MSP) for Shetland since 2019. Wishart currently serves as education spokesperson for her party, and has a seat on the Scottish Parliament committees for Education and Skills, for Culture, Tourism, Europe and External Affairs, and for COVID-19. She was elected at the 2019 Shetland by-election, after the sitting Liberal Democrat MSP Tavish Scott stepped down.

Early life
Wishart was born in 1955 or 1956 in Lerwick, Shetland, where she attended Anderson High School.

Political career
Wishart stood in the 2017 Scottish local elections as an independent candidate for Shetland Islands Council, being elected as one of four members for the Lerwick South ward. After the election she was appointed depute convenor of the Council.

In July 2019 she was selected as a candidate for the Scottish Liberal Democrats for the 2019 Shetland by-election scheduled for 29 August, having been associated with the party for the previous decade – running the offices of Alistair Carmichael, MP for Orkney and Shetland, and the outgoing MSP for Shetland, Tavish Scott. The campaign was hard fought; the SNP spent £100,000 on the by-election – more money than the party spent during the entire EU referendum – and there was a swing of over 14% to their candidate. Wishart held the seat for the Scottish Liberal Democrats with a majority of 1,837 votes or 15.5%. She made her maiden speech in the Scottish Parliament on 10 September 2019, which concerned immigration into Scotland after Brexit.

Shortly after being elected, Wishart was appointed as education spokesperson for the Scottish Liberal Democrats, and was made a member of the Scottish Parliament's Education and Skills Committee. Wishart, who had previously worked on the Shetland Islands Council's Education and Families Committee, stressed her belief that "getting a high quality education helps people meet their full potential in life". Since February 2020, Wishart has also sat on the Scottish Parliament's Culture, Tourism, Europe and External Affairs Committee, taking over from Mike Rumbles.

In a letter to Nicola Sturgeon in April 2020, Wishart suggested that the Shetland Islands could be "the ideal place to pilot an exit strategy from lockdown", which had been put in place in response to the COVID-19 pandemic. Wishart cited as "encouraging" statements made by Hugh Pennington, emeritus professor at the University of Aberdeen, who had noted that "there could soon be a case for a geographical lifting of restrictions – such as in some of the Scottish islands and the Highlands and Grampian". Later that month, Wishart was appointed as a member of the Scottish Parliament's COVID-19 Committee.

At the 2021 Scottish Parliament election, Wishart was re-elected with a majority of 806 votes, the third smallest majority of that election.

References

External links
 

Living people
People from Lerwick
Liberal Democrat MSPs
Members of the Scottish Parliament 2016–2021
Members of the Scottish Parliament 2021–2026
Female members of the Scottish Parliament
Scottish Liberal Democrat councillors
People educated at Anderson High School, Lerwick
Councillors in Shetland
Women councillors in Scotland
Year of birth missing (living people)
1950s births